Frank Riley Castleman (March 17, 1877 – October 9, 1946) was an American football and baseball player, track athlete, and coach in multiple sports.  He competed for the United States in the 200 metre hurdles at the 1904 Summer Olympics held in St. Louis, Missouri, where he won the silver medal.  Castleman was a member of the Greater New York Irish American Athletic Association, which became the Irish American Athletic Club. He competed mainly in the 200 metre hurdles. Castleman graduated from Colgate University in 1906.

Castleman served as the head football coach at the University of Colorado at Boulder in 1906 and 1907, compiling a record of 7–6–4.  He was also the head basketball coach at Colorado in from 1906 to 1912, tallying a mark of 32–22, and the head baseball coach at the school from 1907 to 1913, amassing a record of 30–17.  He was later the track coach at Ohio State University, where his team won the 1929 NCAA Men's Track and Field Championships.

Castleman died at his home in Columbus, Ohio on October 9, 1946 at the age of 69.

Head coaching record

Football

References

External links
 

1877 births
1946 deaths
American male hurdlers
Athletes (track and field) at the 1904 Summer Olympics
Basketball coaches from New York (state)
Olympic silver medalists for the United States in track and field
Colgate Raiders baseball players
Colgate Raiders football players
Colorado Buffaloes baseball coaches
Colorado Buffaloes football coaches
Colorado Buffaloes men's basketball coaches
Ohio State Buckeyes track and field coaches
Ohio State University faculty
College men's track and field athletes in the United States
People from Vestal, New York
Players of American football from New York (state)
Coaches of American football from New York (state)
Medalists at the 1904 Summer Olympics